The 1947 Chicago White Sox season was the White Sox's 47th season in the major leagues, and their 48th season overall. They finished with a record of 70–84, good enough for 6th place in the American League, 27 games behind the first place New York Yankees.

Offseason 
 February 13, 1947: Frankie Hayes was released by the White Sox.
 Prior to 1947 season: Tod Davis was acquired by the White Sox from the Hollywood Stars as part of a minor league working agreement.

Regular season 
 July 5: In a game against the White Sox, Larry Doby of the Cleveland Indians became the first black player to appear in an American League game. Doby appeared in the seventh inning and struck out.

Season standings

Record vs. opponents

Opening Day lineup

Notable transactions 
 April 23, 1947: Gus Zernial was purchased by the White Sox from the Cleveland Indians.
 July 1947: Pete Wojey was acquired by the White Sox from the Hot Springs Bathers.

Roster

Player stats

Batting 
Note: G = Games played; AB = At bats; R = Runs scored; H = Hits; 2B = Doubles; 3B = Triples; HR = Home runs; RBI = Runs batted in; BB = Base on balls; SO = Strikeouts; AVG = Batting average; SB = Stolen bases

Pitching 
Note: W = Wins; L = Losses; ERA = Earned run average; G = Games pitched; GS = Games started; SV = Saves; IP = Innings pitched; H = Hits allowed; R = Runs allowed; ER = Earned runs allowed; HR = Home runs allowed; BB = Walks allowed; K = Strikeouts

Farm system 

LEAGUE CHAMPIONS: Waterloo

References

External links 
 1947 Chicago White Sox at Baseball Reference

Chicago White Sox seasons
Chicago White Sox season
Chicago White